Tornovka is a rural locality (a village) in Izyaksky Selsoviet, Blagoveshchensky District, Bashkortostan, Russia. The population was 22 as of 2010. There are 2 streets.

Geography 
Tornovka is located 28 km southeast of Blagoveshchensk (the district's administrative centre) by road. Verkhny Izyak is the nearest rural locality.

References 

Rural localities in Blagoveshchensky District